Rikissa Magnusdotter of Sweden (ca 1285 – 17 December 1348)  was a Swedish princess. 
She was the daughter of King Magnus III of Sweden (Magnus Ladulås) and his Queen consort Hedwig of Holstein. At the age of six, she was entrusted to the nuns at St. Clara Priory (Sankta Klara kloster) in Stockholm. The nunnery had been given large donations and lands upon its foundation by King Magnus.
Rikissa was the abbess of  St. Clara Priory  from at least 1335 until her death in 1348.

References

Other sources
Christer Engstrand   (1976) Sverige och dess regenter under 1000 år  (Stockholm: Bonnier AB) 

1285 births
Swedish Roman Catholic abbesses
1348 deaths
Swedish princesses
14th-century Swedish nuns
House of Bjelbo
14th-century Swedish nobility
13th-century Swedish nobility
Daughters of kings